OOCR may refer to:

 -OOCR, a functional group that identifies the Carboxylic acid anhydride family of organic compounds
 Open Optical Character Recognition, an open source optical character recognition project